The following outline is provided as an overview of and topical guide to aesthetics:

Aesthetics – branch of philosophy and axiology concerned with the nature of beauty.

What type of thing is an aesthetic? 

Aesthetics can be described as all of the following:
 Branch of philosophy –
 the philosophical study of beauty
 the sublime
 Aesthetic judgments
 Aesthetic taste
 the philosophy of art
 Definitions of art
 Value of art
 Attitudes toward art

Related academic areas 
 Aesthetics of music
 Applied aesthetics
 Architecture
 Art
 Arts criticism
 Gastronomy
 History of painting
 Painting
 Philosophy of film
 Philosophy of music
 Poetry
 Sculpture
 Theory of painting

History of aesthetics 
 History of aesthetics
 History of aesthetics (pre-20th-century)

Aesthetics and art movements 
 Classicism
 Romanticism
 Historicism
 Modernism
 Symbolism
 Postmodernism
 Psychoanalytic theory

Concepts in aesthetics 
 Aesthetic emotions
 Art manifesto
 Art object
 Avant-garde
 Beauty
 Boring
 Comedy
 Camp
 Creativity
 Cute
 Disgusting
 Ecstasy
 Elegance
 Entertainment
 Ephemerality
 Eroticism
 Fun
 Gaze
 Harmony
 Humour
 Interpretation
 Judgement
 Kitsch
 Literary merit
 Mathematics and art
 Mathematical beauty
 Perception
 Picturesque
 Pretentious
 Rasa
 Style
 Sublime
 Taste
 Tragedy
more...

Philosophers of art and aestheticians

Ancient 

 Plato
 Aristotle
 Plotinus
 Augustine

Pre-20th Century 

 Francis Hutcheson
 David Hume
 Adam Smith
 Immanuel Kant
 Edmund Burke
 Johann Gottfried Herder
 Johann Wolfgang von Goethe
 Friedrich Schiller
 G. W. F. Hegel
 Arthur Schopenhauer
 Friedrich Nietzsche

Contemporary 

 Theodor W. Adorno
 Alexander Gottlieb Baumgarten
 Clive Bell
 Walter Benjamin
 Bernard Bosanquet
 Edward Bullough
 R. G. Collingwood
 Arthur Danto
 John Dewey
 Hubert Dreyfus
 Curt John Ducasse
 Thierry de Duve
 Roger Fry
 Nelson Goodman
 Martin Heidegger
 Paul Klee
 Susanne Langer
 Theodor Lipps
 György Lukács
 Jean-François Lyotard
 Joseph Margolis
 Jacques Maritain
 Maurice Merleau-Ponty
 Thomas Munro
 José Ortega y Gasset
 Dewitt H. Parker
 Stephen Pepper
 David Prall
 I. A. Richards
 George Santayana
 Irving Singer
 Richard Wollheim
 more ...

See also

References

External links 

 
 
 
 Medieval Theories of Aesthetics article in the Internet Encyclopedia of Philosophy
 Revue online Appareil
 Postscript 1980- Some Old Problems in New Perspectives
 Aesthetics in Art Education: A Look Toward Implementation
 More about Art, culture and Education
 An history of aesthetics
 The Concept of the Aesthetic
 Aesthetics entry in the Routledge Encyclopedia of Philosophy
 Philosophy of Aesthetics entry in the Philosophy Archive
 Washington State Board for Community & Technical Colleges: Introduction to Aesthetics
 Art Perception Complete pdf version of art historian David Cycleback's

aesthetics
aesthetics

Aesthetics